Janet Jackson's Rhythm Nation 1814 (or popularized as Rhythm Nation) is the fourth studio album by American singer-songwriter Janet Jackson, released on September 19, 1989, by A&M Records. Although label executives wanted material similar to her previous album, Control (1986), Jackson insisted on creating a concept album addressing social issues. Collaborating with songwriters and record producers Jimmy Jam and Terry Lewis, she drew inspiration from various tragedies reported through news media, exploring racism, poverty, and substance abuse, in addition to themes of romance. Although its primary concept of a sociopolitical utopia was met with mixed reactions, its composition received critical acclaim. Jackson came to be considered a role model for youth because of her socially conscious lyrics.

As with Control, recording for Rhythm Nation 1814 took place at Lewis and Jam's Flyte Tyme Studios in Minneapolis, Minnesota where they worked in seclusion with Jackson to complete the album. Noted for its use of sampling and utilizing heavily swung synthesized percussion throughout its production, the record encompasses a variety of musical styles, such as new jack swing, hard rock, pop, dance and industrial music. Songs range from mechanized dance rhythms to soft balladry, giving it appeal across multiple radio formats. It is the only album in the history of the US Billboard Hot 100 singles chart to have seven commercial singles peak within the top five positions. It is also the first album to produce number one hits on the chart in three separate calendar years, beginning with "Miss You Much" in 1989, "Escapade" and "Black Cat" in 1990, and culminating with "Love Will Never Do (Without You)" in 1991.

Rhythm Nation 1814 became Jackson's second consecutive album to top the Billboard 200 and was certified 6× Platinum by the Recording Industry Association of America (RIAA). It became the best-selling album of 1990 in the United States and has sold an estimated 12 million copies worldwide. Due to its innovative production and lyrical exploration, critics have come to regard it as the pinnacle of Jackson's artistic achievement. Music scholars note the record garnered her a level of cross-cultural appeal unmatched by industry peers. Considered a "landmark" album, it has also been cited as an influence in the works of numerous music artists, setting stylistic trends in the years following its release.

Visuals in music videos and live performances further elevated Jackson's superstardom. The 30-minute Rhythm Nation 1814 film, a film depicting two aspiring musicians whose lives are disrupted by substance abuse, aired on MTV to promote the album. Jackson's Rhythm Nation World Tour 1990 became the most successful debut concert tour by a recording artist at the time. She was regarded as a fashion icon, with various attire the album's promotional tour and music videos being emulated by youth. Jackson received nine Grammy Award nominations, becoming the first woman to be nominated for Producer of the Year and winning Best Long Form Music Video for Rhythm Nation 1814. Jackson received the MTV Video Vanguard Award and a star on the Hollywood Walk of Fame for her significant contributions to popular culture. Her handwritten lyrics to the album's title track "Rhythm Nation" as well as her militaristic uniform for its music video have been preserved by the Rock and Roll Hall of Fame. In 2021, the Library of Congress announced it selected the album for preservation in the National Recording Registry as part of the class of 2020, deeming it "culturally, historically, or artistically significant."

Background 
Following the critical and commercial breakthrough of her third studio album Control (1986), Jackson was motivated to take a larger role in her album's creative process. According to Billboard's Hottest Hot 100 Hits (2002), A&M Records requested she record an album similar to Control. It was rumored that label executives suggested a concept album titled Scandal, which would have centered on her personal and family life. However, Jam later denied the claim that Scandal was ever suggested, although he confirmed there was encouragement to produce a "Control II". Jackson opposed the idea of a direct sequel to Control, stating "that's what I didn't want to do. I wanted to do something that I really believed in and that I really felt strong about." She was initially criticized for choosing to dedicate the album's theme to social consciousness, but remained committed. Jam stated that her inspiration came primarily from watching CNN and other news sources. In particular, her reaction to the Stockton playground murders led to recording "Livin' in a World (They Didn't Make)", "Rhythm Nation" and "State of the World".

While discussing the origin of the title "Rhythm Nation", Jackson stated she first uttered the phrase during a conversation with her producers. "I thought it would be great if we could create our own nation" adding that it would be "one that would have a positive message and that everyone would be free to join." She based the idea on the prevalence of various youth groups and organizations that are formed as a means of creating a common identity. The usage of the number "1814" represents the year the national anthem "The Star-Spangled Banner" was written. Rolling Stone emphasized the core concept is further explored in the album's opening pledge (the first track of the recording), which states: "We are a nation with no geographic boundaries, bound together through our beliefs. We are like-minded individuals, sharing a common vision, pushing toward a world rid of color-lines." Several critics noted that "R" (Rhythm) and "N" (Nation) are the eighteenth and fourteenth letters of the alphabet, though Jackson said this was coincidental.

Jackson's primary goal for the record was to reach a younger audience who may have been unaware of what it means to be socially conscious individuals. She expressed: "I wanted to capture their attention through my music." She was influenced by other musical acts such as Joni Mitchell, Bob Dylan, Tracy Chapman, and U2, although she felt their music appealed primarily to adults who were already invested in social change. She also stated, "I'm not naive—I know an album or a song can't change the world. I just want my music and my dance to catch the audience's attention" hoping it would motivate people to "make some sort of difference".

Composition and production 
Rhythm Nation 1814 was recorded over a period of seven months. Its production took place at Flyte Tyme studios in Minneapolis, Minnesota, with majority of the album being recorded in the winter of 1988. According to Jam, he, Lewis and Jackson chose to isolate themselves to compose the record. No one from A&M Records was invited to the studio to observe and label executives complied with their request. The trio co-authored six of the album's songs: "Rhythm Nation", "State of the World", "Alright", "Escapade", "Come Back to Me" and "Someday Is Tonight". Five of the six remaining songs for the record, "The Knowledge", "Miss You Much", "Love Will Never Do (Without You)", "Livin' in a World (They Didn't Make)" and "Lonely" were penned by Jam and Lewis, while "Black Cat" was written solely by Jackson. She co-produced the album with Jam and Lewis, while John McClain served as executive producer; the song "Black Cat" was produced by Jellybean Johnson.

The LP was produced primarily through use of synthesizers and drum machines. Prior its recording, Jam and Lewis had begun to update their equipment for Flyte Tyme studios, experimenting with different types of drum machines and keyboards. While Control had been recorded primarily using the LinnDrum machine, songs for Rhythm Nation 1814 were mostly recorded using the E-mu SP-1200, which was more commonplace for hip hop music at the time. The Oberheim OB-8 analog synthesizer, as well as those made by Sequential Circuits, were also used for mixing and recording. The only equipment utilized for the recording of Control that was also used for producing Rhythm Nation 1814 was the Ensoniq Mirage keyboard. The instrumental tracks for "Miss You Much", "Love Will Never Do (Without You)" and "Escapade" were among the first to be recorded, considered to be follow-ups to the "beat-heavy, catchy songs" that Jackson, Jam and Lewis crafted on Control which "defined the punch and power of 1980s dance and pop music."

Jam noted it was commonplace for Jackson to sing her vocals with the base track first and then have the rest of the song built around it in order to make her voice the center of the piece. "Janet did all of her background vocals and not just the lead vocals. The idea with her has always been that she does all of her own vocals, so that it's totally a Janet record." On the title track "Rhythm Nation", her vocals range from B3 to A5, climaxing within its middle eight. Musicologist Richard J. Ripani observed the album and title track showcased the variety of contemporary R&B styles, making "use of elements across the R&B spectrum, including use of a sample loop ("Rhythm Nation" samples "Thank You (Falettinme Be Mice Elf Agin)" by Sly and the Family Stone), triplet swing, rapped vocal parts and blues notes (D naturals and G naturals)." This style of music, known as new jack swing, was immensely popular in the late 1980s and early 1990s. Though officially credited to the production techniques of Teddy Riley, Ripani theorized Riley was influenced by Jackson's 1986 single "Nasty", which also features a distinctive triplet swing. Jon Pareles observed the album's diversity catered to a wide variety of radio formats, including pop, quiet storm, Adult contemporary and mainstream rock. "Black Cat" was a stand-out for the record, not only for being composed exclusively by Jackson, but for its stark departure from her general style of music, delving into hard rock. While Jellybean Johnson was elected to produce it, Dave Berry was recruited to play guitar for the song. It was recorded using a mixture of Rockman and Marshall amplifier to give the song a heavy metal sound.

The sequencing of the record's track list was done strategically, starting with songs that lyrically depict societal injustices and ending with those that explore love, relationships and sexuality. This decision also factored into the album's artwork and marketing, giving it an overt black and white militant imagery. Jam explained that "[t]he idea of putting 'Rhythm Nation', 'State of the World' and 'The Knowledge' as the first three songs on the record really set the tone as to what the record was. Then to have the segue after that where she says, 'Get the point? Good. Let's dance ...' and then go into 'Miss You Much', that was purposely done." He also stated that the safer marketing strategy for the project would have been "a beautiful colored picture of Janet on the cover" with Escapade as its title, starting the track listing with "Miss You Much", "Love Will Never Do (Without You)" and "Escapade", and ending it with "Livin' in a World (They Didn't Make)", "The Knowledge" and "Rhythm Nation" but noted that despite being the same collection of songs, the alternate sequencing and imagery would not have had the same impact. Of its lyrical themes, Kate Kelly stated the album "reveals a social conscience speaking of getting an education, avoiding drugs, and feeding the homeless. All this might seem a little heavy for dance music or pop radio, but Jackson fuses her concepts with driving dance energy that hits the hearts of those hitting the dance-floor." Andrew Barker of Variety described it as "a quasi-concept album whose opening three songs directly addressed crime, the crack epidemic, racism, homelessness and youth illiteracy — not exactly a recipe for a party. And yet the record was somehow even more successful than Control, generating a then-record seven top-five singles."

Promotion and videography 

Upon the release of the album's lead single "Miss You Much", A&M Records issued a press release for the record, announcing social themes to "run throughout much of the material". Jackson performed "Rhythm Nation" on several television shows internationally, including Top of the Pops and a Royal Variety Performance. She also performed a controversial rendition of "Black Cat" at the 1990 MTV Video Music Awards in which she tore open her snapped blouse; although this was routine for performances of the song in concert, it was considered to have "ushered in a new age of sexual spontaneity" for the singer and viewed as the first "shocking" performance of her career.

A thirty-minute long-form music video, Rhythm Nation 1814, was produced to promote the album. Referred to as a "telemusical", the storyline incorporates three separate music videos: "Miss You Much", "The Knowledge", and "Rhythm Nation". Jackson and director Dominic Sena developed the screenplay, which centers around two boys whose dreams of pursuing music careers are destroyed through substance abuse and drug trafficking. Sena referred to the film as the "1814 Project", attempting to keep the public unaware that Jackson was filming on the streets of Los Angeles. The project had a budget of $1.6 million and was aired on MTV prior to the album's release. A&M co-founder Jerry Moss stated that the decision to film the composite videos all at once for Rhythm Nation 1814 regardless of budget was "a brilliant way to go" allotting Jackson more time to focus her attention elsewhere.

Parallel Lines: Media Representations of Dance (1993) observed that in Rhythm Nation 1814, Jackson represents a "modern good fairy" attempting to guide troubled youth to a more positive way of life. Each of the three segments serve a different purpose, beginning with affinity and companionship in "Miss You Much", followed by anger and frustration in her rooftop solo and ending with "Rhythm Nation", in which Jackson and her dancers "have become a uniformed, formidable army, whose controlled energetic moves and shouts project a disciplined resolution to inspire others through dance and music." Their group dynamic visually depicts a gender neutral equality, with Jackson "performing asexually and anonymously in front of, but as one of the members of the group." It is also noted that the success of the film is not only the final product, but in the commercial and social implications of its development. In selecting an unknown street dancer, Anthony Thomas, to develop her choreography, "Janet Jackson secures a threefold achievement: she satisfies the dictates of the commercial pop music industry by creating a dance image which is significantly different from her earlier work; she demonstrates that, despite fame, she is still in touch with contemporary youth pop culture and its fashions; and finally, she [utilizes], not the dance traditions of Hollywood musical ... but the work of a young black man whose training is outside the institutions of Western theatre and clearly an Afro-American cultural expression of the late 1980s." The film received positive reception. Jefferson Graham in USA Today commented that "she dances up a storm in the moody black-and-white video's three songs ... and plays the role of a mystical figure to young kids." Jon Pareles remarked that "[it] juxtaposes her dance routines with grim urban imagery and a plot line about drugs versus dreams." It was later released on VHS and LaserDisc as the Rhythm Nation 1814 Compilation, and reissued the following year with each of the album's promotional music videos. Jackson received two MTV Music Video Award nominations for "Best Dance Video" and "Best Choreography" for "Rhythm Nation", winning the latter.

Five other music video were produced to promote the album's singles. While the video for "Black Cat" was taken from live footage of Jackson's concerts, those for "Escapade" and "Alright" utilized a Broadway-influenced production. The video for "Alright" was an homage to choreographer Michael Kidd, who was asked to participate in the project and also featured appearances by the flash dancing Nicholas Brothers, actress Cyd Charisse and bandleader Cab Calloway. An extended version of the video also features rapper Heavy D. The somber video for "Come Back To Me" was filmed near the Eiffel Tower in Paris, France. Similarly, "Love Will Never Do (Without You)" was a notable departure from the typically elaborate choreography associated with Jackson's other videos, focusing on her as an individual rather than as a part of a dancing troupe. Featuring appearances by Antonio Sabàto Jr. and Djimon Hounsou, the sandy beach setting exemplifies director Herb Ritts "signature style through use of graceful movements, bold contrasts, and wide-open spaces." The music video is also regarded as the origin of what would later become Jackson's sexually overt persona, freely displaying her legs, torso and cleavage, as well as touching her own bare skin and Sabàto, Jr's in a sensual manner. In Present Tense: Rock & Roll and Culture (1992), Anthony DeCurtis states that "[t]he video celebrates hedonism and voyeurism; there are languorous displays of Jackson's body in ripped jeans and brief top, and of several muscular male bodies, black and white, with bare arms, and chests." She received the MTV Video Vanguard Award, regarded as MTV's highest honor for artists whose videography has significantly impacted pop culture.

Rhythm Nation World Tour 1990 

The Rhythm Nation World Tour 1990 was Jackson's debut concert tour. Described as "an elaborately choreographed spectacle", it aimed to recreate the award-winning, innovative music videos of Rhythm Nation 1814 and those of its predecessor, Control. Anthony Thomas served as the tour's main choreographer, while Chuckii Booker became its musical director and opening act. She was assisted by a team of eleven musicians, five back-up singers, and six dancers. Jackson's total production and staging reportedly cost $2 million. In addition to Jackson's choreography, the tour was reported to portray "dazzling lighting effects and pyrotechnics", as well as illusionary magic, in which Jackson was transformed into a leopard on stage.

Writing for Time magazine, Jay Cocks observed the show to integrate "sleek high tech and smooth dance rhythm into an evening of snazzy soul with a social conscience." Chris Willman of the Los Angeles Times remarked that Jackson's choreography "represents the pinnacle of what can be done in the popping 'n' locking style—a rapid-fire mixture of rigidly jerky and gracefully fluid movements." Several critics noted Jackson lip synced portions of the show, in a similar fashion to her contemporaries. Jon Pareles commented, "most lip-synched shows are done by video-era pop performers whose audiences are young and television trained. They fill arenas to enjoy a spectacle like what they saw on television—the dancing ... the stage effects and incidentally the songs." Michael MacCambridge considered it a "moot point" stating, "Jackson was frequently singing along with her own pre-recorded vocals, to achieve a sound closer to radio versions of singles."

The tour became the most successful debut concert tour in history, with an attendance of over two million. It also set a record for the fastest sell-out of Japan's Tokyo Dome, selling out within seven minutes. Jackson became the only female artist other than Madonna to fill arenas at the time. It was ranked the fifth most successful tour of 1990, making her the only female artist to place within the top ten. It also solidified her reputation as a fashion icon, as fans imitated her "Rhythm Nation" outfit and regalia. Ebony magazine reported "hoards of teen girls were imitating her distinctive look—black quasi-military long jackets, black tight-tight pants, and big white shirts." Joel Selvin of the San Francisco Chronicle wrote "the 23-year-old has been making smash hit records for four years, becoming a fixture on MTV and a major role model to teenage girls across the country." Over $450,000.00 in proceeds from the tour's Madison Square Garden show were used to establish the Rhythm Nation scholarship program. The annual scholarship awards $5,000.00 to students majoring in performing arts and communications at United Negro College Fund member colleges and universities. William Allen, then-executive vice president of the UNCF, remarked: "Jackson is a role model for all young people to emulate and the message she has gotten to the young people of this country through the lyrics of 'Rhythm Nation 1814' is having positive effects."

Singles 

Rhythm Nation 1814 produced a record-setting seven top five hit singles on the Billboard Hot 100. With lead single "Miss You Much", along with "Escapade", "Black Cat" and the album's final single "Love Will Never Do (Without You)", it also yielded four number one hits. "Miss You Much" topped the chart for four weeks. It also topped the Hot Dance Club Songs and Hot R&B/Hip-Hop Songs charts. The single was certified platinum by the RIAA. It also reached number two in Canada and New Zealand, one in Japanese airplay and South Africa, twelve in Australia, the top fifteen in Belgium and the Netherlands, the top twenty in Germany, Sweden, and Switzerland, and twenty-two in the United Kingdom, as well as charting in Brazil. According to Radio & Records, "Miss You Much" was the biggest airplay hit of the year. It sold over four million copies worldwide, and became the year's second-best selling single behind Phil Collins's "Another Day in Paradise".

"Rhythm Nation" peaked at number two, behind "Another Day in Paradise". It peaked atop Hot R&B/Hip-Hop Songs and Hot Dance Club Songs. The single was certified gold by the RIAA. It reached number six in Canada, two in Japanese airplay and South Africa, eleven in the Netherlands, fifteen in Belgium, the top twenty of New Zealand and Sweden, and the top twenty-five of Switzerland, Poland, and the United Kingdom. "Escapade" topped the Hot 100, as well as the Hot R&B/Hip-Hop Songs and Hot Dance Club Songs. It was certified gold in May 1990. It reached number one in Canada and Japanese airplay, four in South Africa, ten in Sweden and Belgium, thirteen in the Netherlands, seventeen in the United Kingdom, and twenty-three in Germany. The single version of "Alright" featuring additional vocals from rapper Heavy D peaked at number four on the Hot 100 and Hot Dance Club Songs, while reaching number two on Hot R&B/Hip-Hop Songs. It was certified gold in June 1990. It reached number six in Canada, three in South Africa, and one in Japanese airplay. "Come Back to Me" peaked at number two on the Hot 100. It reached number three in Canada, as well as number one in Japanese airplay and South Africa, and the top twenty in Poland, Sweden, and the United Kingdom.

"Black Cat" topped the Hot 100 and received gold certification. It reached number four in Canada and three in Japanese airplay, five in Norway, six in Australia, the top ten in Sweden, France, and Switzerland, the top fifteen in the United Kingdom, the top twenty in Belgium, and twenty-one in the Netherlands. "Love Will Never Do (Without You)" was released as the album's seventh and final commercial single. It reached number one on January 19, 1991, topping the chart for one week. It reached number one in Canada and Japanese airplay, and two in South Africa. The single was certified gold by the RIAA. Lastly, "State of the World" was issued solely for radio airplay, making it ineligible to chart. It reached number five on the Hot 100 Airplay (Radio Songs) chart. Billboard noted it likely would have been the album's eighth top five hit if a commercial product had been distributed.

Critical reception 

The album received generally positive reviews, with a mixed reaction to Jackson's social and political themes. Dennis Hunt of the Los Angeles Times called it "intriguing" and diverse, ranging from "social commentary to lusty, sensual tunes, from dance music to songs laced with jazz and Brazilian textures." Vince Aletti of Rolling Stone likened Jackson's themes to a politician, "abandoning the narrow 'I' for the universal 'we' and inviting us to do the same." Aletti complimented Jackson's balance of "despair with optimism, anger with hope", incorporated within its theme of social progress. Andy Ellis-Widders of Keyboard considered it "a powerful statement on racial integration, social accountability, and personal integrity." In his review for The Boston Globe, Steve Morse compared its success to that of Aerosmith and Billy Joel, declaring it "a dance record with a ruthlessly frank social conscience that addresses drugs, homelessness, illiteracy and teen runaways. She's reached far beyond dance music's fluffy image to unite even serious rockers and rappers who usually look the other way." Michael Snyder of the San Francisco Chronicle considered it a worthy successor to Jackson's previous album Control, adding "a little sociopolitical substance" as she "bounces between the two extremes of romance and generalized, politically correct topicality."

Writing for The New York Times, Jon Pareles viewed Rhythm Nation 1814 as having been "thoroughly calculated" for massive commercial success, noting that, as with Pink Floyd's The Dark Side of the Moon (1973) and Guns N' Roses' Appetite for Destruction (1987), consumers might find that "[b]uying the album can mean endorsing an attitude ... the album becomes a cause without a rebellion." Pareles commended its musicality and vocals, stating "[t]he tone of the music is airless, sealing out imprecision and reveling in crisp, machine-generated rhythms; Ms. Jackson's piping voice, layered upon itself in punchy unisons or lavish harmonies, never cracks or falters." Robert Christgau wrote in his review for The Village Voice, "Her voice is as unequal to her vaguely admonitory politics as it was to her declaration of sexual availability, but the music is the message."

In 1990, the album earned Grammy Award nominations for "Best Female R&B Vocal Performance" and "Best Rhythm & Blues Song" for "Miss You Much", and "Best Instrumental Arrangement Accompanying Vocalist" and "Best Long Form Music Video" for "Rhythm Nation", winning the latter award. Jackson was also nominated for "Producer of the Year, Non-Classical", becoming the first woman to be nominated for the award. The following year, Jackson received nominations for "Best Female Rock Vocal Performance" for "Black Cat", in addition to "Best Rhythm & Blues Song" and "Best R&B Vocal Performance, Female" for "Alright".

Retrospective reviews continue to assess the album favorably. Eric Henderson of Slant Magazine declared the album a "masterpiece". Henderson also praised its diversity, stating: "She was more credibly feminine, more crucially masculine, more viably adult, more believably childlike. This was, of course, critical to a project in which Janet assumed the role of mouthpiece for a nationless, multicultural utopia." Though referring to Jackson's voice as "wafer-thin", Alex Henderson of AllMusic applauded Jackson's spirit and enthusiasm, praising the album's numerous "gems". Henderson regarded it "an even higher artistic plateau" than her prior album, adding: "For those purchasing their first Janet Jackson release, Rhythm Nation would be an even wiser investment than Control—and that's saying a lot." Alexis Petridis of The Guardian described the album as a more "grandiose" counterpart to Control, "tough, funky and driving – the second of a perfect pair."

Accolades

Commercial performance 
The album debuted at number twenty-eight on the Billboard 200 and eighty-seven on Top R&B/Hip-Hop Albums, eventually reaching the number one position on both charts. It topped the Billboard 200 for four consecutive weeks, selling three million copies within the first four months of its release. It sold an additional 1.10 million through BMG Music Club. In November 1989, the Recording Industry Association of America (RIAA) certified the album gold. It was certified double platinum by the end of the year and ultimately certified sixfold platinum by the RIAA. It emerged as the best selling album of 1990 in the territory.

Internationally, the album reached number one in Australia, where it was certified double platinum by the Australian Recording Industry Association (ARIA), and South Africa. In Canada, it entered the top five and was certified platinum. The album peaked at number four in the United Kingdom, receiving a platinum certification. It also entered the top ten of Japan and New Zealand, where it was certified double platinum and gold. It reached the top twenty-five of Sweden, as well as the top thirty in the Netherlands and Germany. It also received gold certifications in Switzerland and Hong Kong. It has sold an estimated 12 million copies worldwide. The Rhythm Nation 1814 video compilation and its reissue were each certified double platinum in United States.

Legacy 
The commercial success of Rhythm Nation 1814 was an unexpected achievement for mainstream pop music. Although Jackson was told focusing her album's theme on social consciousness would negatively impact sales, it was "a prediction soon proved wrong when the album was certified multi-platinum" and subsequently topped the pop, R&B and dance music charts. In She Bop II: The Definitive History of Women in Rock, Pop and Soul (2003), Lucy O'Brien wrote that contrary to A&M's fear that the album would underperform, its multi-platinum sales pushed Jackson to a level of superstardom rivaling her brother Michael, calling it a "personal manifesto" and regarding it as a female counterpart to Marvin Gaye's What's Going On (1971). Timothy E. Scheurer, author of Born in the USA: The Myth of America in Popular Music from Colonial Times to the Present (2007), wrote that the album "may remind some of Sly Stone prior to There's a Riot Going On and other African-American artists of the 1970s in its tacit assumption that the world imagined by Dr. King is still possible, that the American Dream is a dream for all people." It made history as the only album to generate seven top-five hits on the Billboard Hot 100, surpassing Michael Jackson's Thriller (1982) and Bruce Springsteen's Born in the U.S.A. (1984), which each have seven top ten hits. It is also the first album to achieve number one hits in three separate calendar years, with "Miss You Much" in 1989, "Escapade" and "Black Cat" in 1990, and "Love Will Never Do (Without You)" in 1991. This feat would subsequently be matched by The Weeknd's After Hours in 2021. Additionally, it is one of only nine albums—alongside Michael Jackson's Bad (1987), Saturday Night Fever: The Original Movie Sound Track (1977), Whitney Houston's Whitney (1987), George Michael's Faith (1987), Paula Abdul's Forever Your Girl (1989), Mariah Carey's self-titled debut (1990), Usher's Confessions (2004) and
Katy Perry's Teenage Dream (2010)—to produce a minimum of four number ones.

Aside from its commercial performance, the album's composition has continued to receive acclaim for its sonic innovation. Upon its 25th anniversary, music critic and scholar Joseph Vogel observed that when viewed "as a complete artistic statement, Rhythm Nation 1814 was a stunning achievement. It married the pleasures of pop with the street energy and edge of hip-hop." Kyle Anderson of Entertainment Weekly asserted the record "has barely aged—it sounds as rich and vital as it did when it was first released, and stylistically as contemporary as anything on the Billboard charts." Anderson also underscores that it pioneered several musical trends, citing records by pop and R&B artists including Rihanna, Pink, Beyoncé, Frank Ocean, Gwen Stefani, The Weeknd, Lady Gaga, Jhené Aiko, Miguel, Christina Aguilera, FKA Twigs, and Tinashe that have exhibited similarities to the "landmark" album. Its single for "Alright" featuring Heavy D made Jackson the first pop artist to team with a rapper, "setting the trend for future pop and hip-hop collaborations." Additionally, "Black Cat" set a precedent for female pop stars segueing into glam metal. The album notably influenced Michael Jackson's Dangerous (1991) and HIStory (1995), the latter of which features the sibling's duet "Scream", produced by Jimmy Jam and Terry Lewis. Its impact also extends to indie and alternative rock music, with School of Seven Bells, A Sunny Day in Glasgow, and Alexis Krauss of Sleigh Bells citing the album as an influence in their work. MTV's Brenna Ehrlich remarked: "From Beyoncé ... to Britney Spears to Robyn to Sleigh Bells, the influence of Jackson's game-changer of a record is still rippling through the radio waves (or SoundCloud waves) today."

Jackson's handwritten lyrics to "Rhythm Nation" have been preserved by the Rock and Roll Hall of Fame's "Women Who Rock" exhibit, which Kathryn Metz describes as "the perfect platform to talk about song structure" for the museum's "Women Who Rock: Songwriting and Point of View" course, in which students analyze music written by female songwriters. The Hall has also preserved her military styled "Rhythm Nation" uniform. Rolling Stone observed the song's music video "set the template for hundreds of videos to come in the Nineties and aughts." Mike Weaver remarked the "innovative, one-of-a-kind, funk-and-groove choreography was unlike anything seen in the history of pop music." Although music historian Ted Gioia considered the song to be an "awkward chant" he commented that "Rhythm Nation" became "one of the most riveting videos of the era, a kind of sensual steampunk for MTV viewers." In 1990, Jackson received MTV's Video Vanguard Award for her contributions to the art form. That same year, she received a star on the Hollywood Walk of Fame in recognition of her impact on the recording industry and philanthropic endeavors, including her Rhythm Nation Scholarship fund. With her contractual obligations to A&M fulfilled in 1991, she signed with Virgin Records for an unprecedented multimillion-dollar deal, becoming the world's highest paid musician at the time.

Sal Cinquemani noted her popularity had eclipsed Michael Jackson's, "as she would continue to do for more than a decade". Music scholars John Shepherd and David Horn wrote that as a crossover artist on the pop and R&B charts, she emerged "the most dominant female performer of the 1980s" behind Whitney Houston. Dan Rubey observed that she presented herself as a role model for black women and as a creative intellect whose work advocated the advancement of black people. Joseph Vogel stated that her rising popularity towards the end of the decade was important for several reasons, "not the least of which was how it coincided with (and spoke to) the rise of black feminism". At a time when radio airplay and MTV primarily catered to white rock musicians, her album and its predecessor garnered widespread critical acclaim alongside other "unprecedented breakthroughs" by black women—including Alice Walker's The Color Purple (1982), Toni Morrison's Beloved (1987) and Patricia Hill Collins's Black Feminist Thought (1990)—musically capturing the spirit of the movement and presenting an alternate model on both womanhood and feminism to that of Madonna. Regarding her diverse appeal among youth, he also stated: "Janet didn't have the vocal prowess of Whitney Houston, or the poetic subtlety of Kate Bush; she didn't have Annie Lennox's penchant for the avant-garde or Madonna's predilection for shock. But none of these artists achieved the cross-racial impact (particularly on youth culture) of Janet. And none of them had an album like Rhythm Nation 1814."

Jackson herself would comment on the album's legacy on her 2015 album Unbreakable. In the song "Shoulda Known Better", she reflects on her optimistic wish that Rhythm Nation 1814 could have profoundly changed the world, noting that there are many, deeper issues to fix and that broad strokes aren't enough. The chorus includes the line, "Cause I don't want my face to be / That poster child for being naive"; and Rhythm Nations title is referred to as "an epiphany", with Jackson mentioning that "next time, I'll know better". Album co-producer Jimmy Jam told the BBC: "When you're young, you feel like: 'I can change the world! I'm going to lead the revolution!' And then you look 25 years later and you go: 'OK, I should have known better. The same problems still exist but there's a different way to go about tackling it. It still involves mobilising people, but I can't do it by myself.' It's just a wiser, more mature look at the reality of trying to make a positive change, a social change." In 2021, the Library of Congress announced it had selected Janet Jackson's Rhythm Nation 1814 for preservation and inducted it into the National Recording Registry. The album is one of 25 recordings inducted into the registry's class of 2020 that are considered to be "audio treasures worthy of preservation for all time based on their cultural, historical or aesthetic importance in the nation’s recorded sound heritage."

Track listing 

Notes
 The original vinyl release does not list the interludes as separate tracks, they are instead located at the beginning of the next track.

Personnel 

Herb Alpert – trumpet, horn, brass
Julie Ayer – violin
Stephen Barnett – conductor
Steve Barnett – conductor
David Barry – electric and 12-string guitar
Lee Blaske – arranger
Chris Brown – bass
Carolyn Daws – violin
Hanley Daws – violin
David Eiland – programming
Rene Elizondo – background vocals
Richard Frankel – art direction, cover design
Brian Gardner – mastering at Bernie Grundman Mastering, Hollywood, CA
Johnny Gill – percussion, special effects, finger snaps
James Greer – background vocals
Guzman (Constance Hansen & Russell Peacock) – photography
Steve Hodge – background vocals, engineer, mixing at Flyte Tyme Studio D, Edina, MN
Peter Howard – cello
Janet Jackson – arranger, keyboards, vocals, background vocals, producer
Jimmy Jam – percussion, piano, drums, keyboards, programming, producer
Jellybean Johnson – guitar, drums, vocals, background vocals, producer
Jesse Johnson – guitar
Lisa Keith – background vocals
Kathy Kienzle – harp
Joshua Koestenbaum – cello
Jamila Lafleur – background vocals
Terry Lewis – bass, percussion, arranger, background vocals, producer
Tshaye Marks – background vocals
John McClain – background vocals, executive producer
Tamika McDaniel – vocals
Tarnika McDaniel – background vocals
John McLain – guitar, background vocals
Shante Owens – background vocals
Amy Powell – vocals
Randy Ran – background vocals
Nicholas Raths – guitar, classical guitar
Sonya Robinson – background vocals
Clarice Rupert – background vocals
Warlesha Ryan – background vocals
Tamas Strasser – viola
John Tartaglia – viola
Reshard Taylor – background vocals
Romuald Tecco – concert master
Anthony Thomas – background vocals
Hyacinthe Tlucek – concert master
Steve Wilson – background vocals

Charts

Weekly charts

Year-end charts

All-time chart

Certifications and sales

See also 
 List of best-selling albums by women
 1001 Albums You Must Hear Before You Die
 The 500 Greatest Albums of All Time

References

External links 
Rhythm Nation 1814 Video Page at Janetjackson.com 

Rhythm Nation 1814 (Adobe Flash) at Radio3Net (streamed copy where licensed)

1989 albums
A&M Records albums
Albums produced by Jimmy Jam and Terry Lewis
Concept albums
Janet Jackson albums
United States National Recording Registry recordings
United States National Recording Registry albums
Political music albums by American artists